Thrace is a geographic region in the eastern Balkans, today divided between Bulgaria, Greece and Turkey.

Historical entities
 Thrace (satrapy), an Achaemenid Persian province
 Odrysian kingdom, which ruled much of Thrace in Antiquity, formed by the Odrysians
 Thracia, a Roman imperial province
 Diocese of Thrace, a late Roman/early Byzantine province
 Thrace (theme), a middle and late Byzantine province

Geographical/political divisions
 Eastern Thrace, the Turkish part of Thrace, also known as European Turkey
 Northern Thrace, the Bulgarian part of Thrace
 Western Thrace, the Greek part of Thrace, part of the East Macedonia and Thrace periphery

Other uses
 Thrace (mythology), the region's eponymous heroine in Greek mythology
 Kara Thrace, a character in the TV series Battlestar Galactica
 Mount Thrace, mountain in Antarctica

See also 
 Thraces
 Thracian (disambiguation)